Crackenthorpe is a village and civil parish in the Eden District of Cumbria, England. The village was on the A66 road until it was by-passed. The population of the civil parish was less than 100 at the 2011 Census. Details are therefore included in the parish of Long Marton.

Crackenthorpe Hall is a large grade II listed house which was rebuilt in the early 17th century and restructured in circa 1685 by Hugh & Thomas Machell. It has since been subdivided into several dwellings. It was reputedly haunted by the ghost of Peg Sneddle, the grey lady of Crackenthorpe. Her body was exhumed and buried in the bed of the River Eden under a boulder of Shap granite known as Peg's stone.

Location grid

See also

Listed buildings in Crackenthorpe

References

External links 

 Cumbria County History Trust: Crackenthorpe (nb: provisional research only – see Talk page)
 http://www.visitcumbria.com/pen/crackenthorpe.htm

Villages in Cumbria
Civil parishes in Cumbria